Mazar-e Shah (also Romanized as Mazār-e Shāh) is a village in Jolgeh-e Mazhan Rural District, Jolgeh-e Mazhan District, Khusf County, South Khorasan Province, Iran. At the 2006 census, its existence was noted, but its population was not reported.  Mazar-e Shah means "tomb of the king" and a pre-Islamic royal tomb is located at the village, which has been registered on the Iranian government's cultural heritage list.

References 

Populated places in Khusf County